Voices is a studio album by American saxophonist Stan Getz, recorded in 1966 and released the following year on Verve Records. It features a chorus singing a chromatic, wordless accompaniment in place of a traditional string-section orchestration.

Track listing
"Once" - 2:50
"I Didn't Know What Time It Was" - 3:24
"Nica's Dream" - 3:57
"Little Rio" - 2:30
"Keep Me in Your Heart" - 4:01
"Zigeuner Song" - 3:10
"I Want to Live" - 2:54
"Where Flamingos Fly" - 3:07
"Midnight Samba" - 2:13
"Infinidad" - 2:09
"Darling Joe" - 2:45

Personnel
Stan Getz - tenor saxophone
Herbie Hancock - piano
Jim Hall - guitar 
Ron Carter - bass
Grady Tate - drums
Bill Horwath - cymbalon
Artie Butler, Bobby Rosengarden - percussion
Claus Ogerman - arranger, conductor
Unidentified chorus

References 

Verve Records albums
Stan Getz albums
1967 albums
Albums recorded at Van Gelder Studio
Albums produced by Creed Taylor